Melnikovo is a rural locality (a selo) and the administrative center of Shegarsky District of Tomsk Oblast, Russia, located near the Ob River. Population:

References

Rural localities in Tomsk Oblast